The Canada women's national soccer team represents the country of Canada in international soccer. It is fielded by the Canada Soccer Association, the governing body of soccer in Canada, and competes as a member of CONCACAF, which encompasses the countries of North America, including Central America and the Caribbean. Canada competed in their first official international match on July 7, 1986, a 2–0 defeat to the United States national team in Blaine, Minnesota.

Canada have competed in numerous competitions, and all players, either as a member of the starting eleven or as a substitute, are listed below. Each player's details include the number of caps earned and goals scored in all international matches, and opponent of their first and last matches played in (a blank in the "last cap" column indicates an active player who has been called up in the last 12 months), ordered alphabetically. All statistics are correct up to and including the match played against the United States on July 18, 2022. Players that are still active at the club and/or international level are in bold.

Full list of players

References

External links
CanadaSoccer.com

 
Canada
Association football player non-biographical articles